Gilles Rocheleau (28 August 1935 – 27 June 1998) was a member of the House of Commons of Canada from 1988 to 1993. He co-founded the Bloc Québécois with Lucien Bouchard in 1990.

Rocheleau was born in Hull, Quebec, he was a businessman by career. His post-secondary education was at the University of Ottawa. He became a city councillor in 1967, then mayor from 1974 to 1981. He was elected as a member of the National Assembly of Quebec in 1981 in Hull as a member of the Liberal Party of Quebec. He was again elected to the Assembly in 1985 and became a cabinet minister in Premier Robert Bourassa's administration.

He left provincial politics to campaign in the 1988 federal election in the Hull—Aylmer electoral district for the national Liberal party. He served in the 34th Canadian Parliament until he left the party on 2 July 1990 following the implosion of the Meech Lake Accord.  After several months as an independent, he became a charter member of the Bloc Québécois party on 20 December 1990.

However, Rocheleau's embrace of Quebec sovereigntism did not play well in his strongly federalist riding, and he was roundly defeated by Liberal candidate Marcel Massé in the 1993 federal election, losing almost half of his vote from 1988.

He was married twice: to Denise Gagné in 1956 and then later to Hélène Roy.

Rocheleau died in Hull at the age of 62.

Electoral record (partial)

References

External links

 Hansard (House of Commons Debates) #128: The Late Gilles Rocheleau, 29 September 1998.

1935 births
1998 deaths
Bloc Québécois MPs
Members of the House of Commons of Canada from Quebec
Liberal Party of Canada MPs
Mayors of Hull, Quebec
Quebec Liberal Party MNAs
University of Ottawa alumni